Velibor Topić (born 24 July 1970 in Mostar, SR Bosnia and Herzegovina, SFR Yugoslavia) is a Bosnian-British actor.

He is known for his roles in Snatch (2000), Kingdom of Heaven (2005), Robin Hood (2010), The Counselor (2013), Kingsman: The Secret Service (2014), as well as for his work in British TV dramas such as Sharpe's Peril (2002), The Bill (2002), Prime Suspect series 6 (2003), and Ambassadors (2013).

Throughout his career, Topić has worked three times with Ridley Scott as well as other well-known directors such as Guy Ritchie, Tom Hooper, Matthew Vaughn, Anthony Minghella and William Monahan.

Early life

Topić was born in Mostar, Bosnia and Herzegovina (former SFR Yugoslavia), to a family of mixed Bosnian Serb, Bosniak and Croatian heritage.

During the war he lived in Sarajevo where he formed part of a theatre group. He also appears in one of Annie Leibovitz's photographs from the time called "Sarajevo – The Kiss".

Career
In 1996 he moved to London.

Topić has over 69 acting credits in UK film, television and Hollywood film productions.

Filmography and Television

External links

Living people
Actors from Mostar
1970 births
Bosnia and Herzegovina male actors
British male film actors
20th-century Bosnia and Herzegovina male actors
21st-century Bosnia and Herzegovina male actors
20th-century British male actors
21st-century British male actors
Bosnian expatriate actors